Each nation brought their under-20 teams to compete in a group and knockout tournament. The top teams and the best second placed team advanced to the knockout stage of the competition. Canada won the tournament after a penalty shootout with Congo.

Group stage

Group A

Group B

Group C

Knockout stage

See also
Football at the Jeux de la Francophonie

1997 Jeux de la Francophonie
1997
1997–98 in Moroccan football
1997–98 in French football
1997 in Canadian soccer
1997 in African football